Bishnupur subdivision is a subdivision of the Bankura district in the state of West Bengal, India.

Subdivisions
Bankura district is divided into the following administrative subdivisions:

Bishnupur subdivision has a density of population of 595 per km2. 29.07% of the population of the district resides in this subdivision.

Administrative units
Bishnupur subdivision has  6 police stations, 6 community development blocks, 6 panchayat samitis, 56 gram panchayats, 890 inhabited villages, 2 municipalities and 1 census town. The municipalities are Bishnupur and Sonamukhi. The census town is: Kotulpur. The subdivision has its headquarters at Bishnupur.

Police stations
Police stations in Bishnupur subdivision have the following features and jurisdiction:

Blocks
Community development blocks in Bishnupur subdivision are:

Gram Panchayats
The subdivision contains 56 gram panchayats under six community development blocks:

Bishnupur block consists of: Ayodhya, Bhara, Morar, Bankadaha, Dwarika–Gossainpur, Radhanagar, Belsulia, Layekbandh and Uliyara.
Indas block consists of: Akui–I, Dighalgram, Karisunda, Sahaspur,  Akui–II, Indas–I, Mongalpur, Amrul, Indas–II and Rol.
Joypur block consists of: Gelia, Kuchiakol, Salda, Hetia, Maynapur, Shyamnagar, Jagannathpur, Rautkhanda and Uttarbarh.
Patrasayer block consists of: Balsi–I, Belut–Rasulpur, Jamkuri, Patrasayar, Balsi–II, Biur–Betur, Kushdwip, Beersingha, Hamirpur and Narayanpur.
Kotulpur block consists of: Deshrahkoyalpara, Kotulpur, Lego, Mirzapur, Gopinathpur, Laugram, Madanmohanpur and Sihar.
Sonamukhi block consists of: Coochdihi, Dihipara, Panchal, Radhamohanpur, Dhansimla, Hamirhati, Piarbera, Dhulai, Manikbazar and Purbanabasan.

Education
Bankura district had a literacy rate of 70.26%  as per the provisional figures of the census of India 2011. Bankura Sadar subdivision had a literacy rate of 69.56%, Khatra subdivision 69.79% and Bishnupur subdivision 71.60%.  

Given in the table below (data in numbers) is a comprehensive picture of the education scenario in Bankura district for the year 2013-14. It may be noted that primary schools include junior basic schools; middle schools, high schools and higher secondary schools include madrasahs; technical schools include junior technical schools, junior government polytechnics, industrial technical institutes, industrial training centres, nursing training institutes etc.; technical and professional colleges include engineering colleges, medical colleges, para-medical institutes, management colleges, teachers training and nursing training colleges, law colleges, art colleges, music colleges etc. Special and non-formal education centres include sishu siksha kendras, madhyamik siksha kendras, centres of Rabindra mukta vidyalaya, recognised Sanskrit tols, institutions for the blind and other handicapped persons, Anganwadi centres, reformatory schools etc.

Educational institutions
The following institutions are located in Bishnupur subdivision:
Ramananda College at Bishnupur was established in 1945. It has four hostels – two for boys, one for girls and one special hostel for meritorious but poor boys.
Mallabhum Institute of Technology was established in 2002. It is affiliated to Maulana Abul Kalam Azad University of Technology. It has hostel facilities.
KG Engineering Institute at Bishnupur is a government polytechnic, started as an industrial school in 1922, became a full-fledged polytechnic in 1949 and taken over by the state government.
Mallabhum Institute of Polytechnic, at Braja Radha Nagar, Bishnupur.
Bishnupur Public Institute of Engineering at Siromonipur, Bishnupur, is a private polytechnic.
Sonamukhi College at Sonamukhi was established in 1966.
Chatra Ramai Pandit Mahavidyalaya, located at Chatra, PO Darapur, Kotulpur CD Block, was established in 2001.
Patrasayer Mahavidyalaya at Patrasayer was established in 2005.
Indas Mahavidyalaya at Indas was established in 2006.
Akui Kamalabala Women's College was established at Akui in 2015.
Swami Dhananjoy Das Kathiababa Mahavidyalaya was established at Bhara in 2009.
Nikhil Banga Sikhsan Mahavidyalaya at Bishnupur was established in 1971 and offers courses leading to B.Ed. and B.P.Ed.
Joypur B.Ed. College at Jaypur,
Bishnupur Public Institute of Education at Siromonipur affiliated to Burdwan University. .[25]

Healthcare
The table below (all data in numbers) presents an overview of the medical facilities available and patients treated in the hospitals, health centres and sub-centres in 2014 in Bankura district.

Medical facilities
Medical facilities in Bishnupur subdivision are as follows:

Hospitals: (Name, location, beds) 

Bishnupur Subdivisional Hospital, Bishnupur, 250 beds

Rural Hospitals: (Name, CD block, location, beds) 

Sonamukhi Rural Hospital, Sonamukhi CD block, Sonamukhi, 30 beds
Kotulpur Rural Hospital, Kotulpur CD block, Kotulpur, 60 beds
Patrasayer Rural Hospital, Patrasayer CD block, Hat Krishnanagar, Patrasayer, 30 beds
Indas Rural Hospital, Indas CD block, Indas, 30 beds
Radhanagar Rural Hospital, Bishnupur CD block, Radhanagar, 30 beds

Block Primary Health Centres: (Name, CD block, location, beds)

Joypur Block Primary Health Centre, Joypur CD block, Joypur, 15 beds

Primary Health Centres : (CD block-wise)(CD block, PHC location, beds)

Sonamukhi CD block: Dhulai (Gopikantapur) (6), Panchal (6), Kundu Pushkarini (10), Sitaljhore (6)
Patrasayer CD block: Purba Naldanga (Roll) (6), Pandua (Kushdwip) (4), Balsi (10)
Kotulpur CD block: Gopinathpur (6), Lego (10), Laugram Karakheria (10), Sihar (10), Mirjapur (4), Deshra (Deopara) (10)
Indas CD block: Akui (4), Keneti (Santasram Indus) (10), Dighalgram (6)
Joypur CD block: Hijaldiha (10), Uttarbar (Magura) (10), Hetia (panchayat management) (6), Jagannathpur (10)
Bishnupur CD block: Ajodhya (6), Kankila (6), Bhora (10)

Electoral constituencies
Lok Sabha (parliamentary) and Vidhan Sabha (state assembly) constituencies in Bankura district were as follows:

References

External links

Subdivisions of West Bengal
Subdivisions in Bankura district
Bankura district